Von Behren is a German surname. Notable people with the surname include:

Frank von Behren (born 1976), German team handball player
Annie Von Behren (1857–1882), American stage actress

German-language surnames